Kanji radicals  are graphemes, or graphical parts, that are used in organizing Japanese kanji in dictionaries. They are derived from the 214 Chinese Kangxi radicals.

Table key
The following table shows the 214 Kangxi radicals, which are derived from 47,035 characters. 

The frequency list is derived from the 47,035 characters in the Chinese language. 
 
The Jōyō frequency is from the set of 2,136 Jōyō kanji.

Top 25% means that this radical represents 25% of Jōyō kanji.
Top 50% means that this radical plus the Top 25% represent 50% of Jōyō kanji.
Top 75% means that this radical plus the Top 50% represent 75% of Jōyō kanji.

Many radicals are not commonly written by themselves so people wouldn't know the technical hiragana reading given here. The simplified table of Japanese kanji radicals page only lists common readings.

Table of radicals

Kanji radicals not recognized by Kangxi
These radicals are either listed as variants or not listed at all in the kangxi radical table.

The 214 Kangxi radicals are technically classifiers as they are not always etymologically correct, but since linguistics uses that word in the sense of "classifying" nouns (such as in counter words) dictionaries commonly call the kanji components radicals. As dictionaries have moved from textbooks to interactive screens the term "radicals" seems to now be used for any kanji component used in a visual search.

Other possible radical candidates

 竹 and 西 (西 to a lesser extent) are only used in their original form when representing the original meanings. As components of jouyou kanji they always appear as ⺮ and 覀.

Position of radical within character
There are fourteen different radical positions, seven basic types and seven variant. The following table lists radical types with Japanese name and position in red and indicate how Kanji is formed by radical with example.

See also 
 List of kanji radicals by frequency
 List of Unicode radicals
 Kangxi radical

References

External links

 http://nihonshock.com/2012/02/kanji-radicals-and-components/
 http://www.hadamitzky.de/english/lp_radical_tables.htm
 http://kanjialive.com/214-traditional-kanji-radicals/
 http://www.joyokanji.com/radical-notes
 All (CJK) Unicode Han characters

Kanji